Drive is an album by American banjoist Béla Fleck. The album was produced toward the end of Fleck's New Grass Revival career and before the Flecktones were formed and included an all-star list of bluegrass performers.

Track listing 
All tracks written by Béla Fleck; except where indicated
 "Whitewater"
 "Slipstream"
 "Up and Around the Bend"
 "Natchez Trace"
 "See Rock City"
 "The Legend"
 "The Lights of Home"
 "Down in the Swamp"
 "Sanctuary"
 "The Open Road"
 "Crucial County Breakdown"

Bonus track on the SACD version*

 "Shuckin' the Corn" (Gladys Stacey, Josh Graves, Louise Certain)

Personnel
 Béla Fleck - banjo
 Tony Rice - guitar
 Sam Bush - mandolin
 Stuart Duncan - fiddle
 Mark O'Connor - fiddle
 Jerry Douglas - Dobro
 Mark Schatz - Bass
 Recorded and Mixed By Bil VornDick

References

1988 albums
Béla Fleck albums
Rounder Records albums